Conquer the Castle is a British reality TV series filmed in Scotland, and broadcast on STV.
 
It is a 12-part series following six city people experiencing Scottish country living. The contestants compete against each other in tasks, including hunting and wilderness survival.

The person who won the competition "Conquered the Castle" and win the competition.

References

2000s British reality television series
2008 Scottish television series debuts
2008 Scottish television series endings
2000s Scottish television series
English-language television shows
Television series by STV Studios